In mathematics, Budan's theorem is a theorem for bounding the number of real roots of a polynomial in an interval, and computing the parity of this number. It was published in 1807 by François Budan de Boislaurent.

A similar theorem was published independently by Joseph Fourier in 1820. Each of these theorems is a corollary of the other. Fourier's statement appears more often in the literature of 19th century and has been referred to as Fourier's, Budan–Fourier, Fourier–Budan, and even Budan's theorem

Budan's original formulation is used in fast modern algorithms for real-root isolation of polynomials.

Sign variation
Let  be a finite sequence of real numbers.

In other words, a sign variation occurs in the sequence at each place where the signs change, when ignoring zeros.

For studying the real roots of a polynomial, the number of sign variations of several sequences may be used. For Budan's theorem, it is the sequence of the coefficients. For the Budan–Fourier theorem, it is the sequence of values of the successive derivatives at a point. For Sturm's theorem it is the sequence of values at a point of the Sturm sequence.

Descartes' rule of signs

All results described in this article are based on Descartes' rule of signs.

If  is a univariate polynomial with real coefficients, let us denote by  the number of its positive real roots, counted with their multiplicity, and by  the number of sign variations in the sequence of its coefficients. Descartes's rule of signs asserts that
 is a nonnegative even integer.

In particular, if , then one has .

Budan's statement 
Let us denote also by  the number of sign variations in the sequence of the coefficients of the polynomial . In particular, one has  with the notation of the preceding section.

Budan's theorem is the following: 
 is a nonnegative even integer.

As  is non negative, this implies 

As for Descartes' rule of signs, if  one has  This means that, if  one has a "zero-root test" and a "one-root test".

Examples 
1. Given the polynomial   and the open interval , one has

 

Thus,  and Budan's theorem asserts that the polynomial  has either two or zero real roots in the open interval 

2. With the same polynomial  one has
 
Thus,  and Budan's theorem asserts that the polynomial  has no real root in the open interval  This is an example of the use of Budan's theorem as a zero-root test.

Fourier's statement 

Each theorem is a corollary of the other. This results from the Taylor expansion 

Thus the sequences considered in Fourier's theorem and in Budan's theorem have the same number of sign variations.

This strong relationship between the two theorems may explain the priority controversy that occurred in 19th century, and the use of several names for the same theorem. In modern usage, for computer computation, Budan's theorem is generally preferred since the sequences have much larger coefficients in Fourier's theorem than in Budan's, because of the factorial factor.

Proof
As each theorem is a corollary of the other, it suffices to prove Fourier's theorem.

Thus, consider a polynomial , and an interval .

Let us denote by  either the polynomial  or any of its derivatives.

If the multiplicity  of the root  is even, then  and  keep a constant sign when  pass through . This implies that the number of sign of variation in the sequence of derivatives decrease by the even number . There are thus  sign variations. 

In summary, the number of sign variations decreases of  if  is even and of  if  is odd, an even numbers in both cases.

History
The problem of counting and locating the real roots of a polynomial started to be systematically studied only in
the beginning of the 19th century.

In 1807, François Budan de Boislaurent discovered a method for extending Descartes' rule of signs—valid for the interval —to any interval.

Joseph Fourier published a similar theorem in 1820, on which he worked for more than twenty years.

Because of the similarity between the two theorems, there was a priority controversy, despite the fact that the two theorems were discovered independently. It was generally Fourier's formulation and proof that were used, during the 19th century, in textbooks on the theory of equations.

Use in 19th century 

Budan's and Fourier's theorems were soon considered of a great importance, although they do not solve completely the problem of counting the number of real roots of a polynomial in an interval. This problem was completely solved 
in 1827 by Sturm.

Although Sturm's theorem is not based on Descartes' rule of signs, Sturm's and Fourier's theorems are related not only by the use of the number of sign variations of a sequence of numbers, but also by a similar approach of the problem. Sturm himself acknowledged having been inspired by Fourier's methods: « C'est en m'appuyant sur les principes qu'il a posés, et en imitant ses démonstrations, que j'ai trouvé les nouveaux théorèmes que je vais énoncer. » which translates into « It is by relying upon the principles he has laid out and by imitating his proofs that I have found the new theorems which I am about to present. »

Because of this, during the 19th century, Fourier's and Sturm's theorems appeared together in almost all books on the theory of equations.

Fourier and Budan left open the problem of reducing the size of the intervals in which roots are searched in a way that, eventually, the difference between the numbers of sign variations is at most one, allowing certifying that the final intervals contains at most one root each. This problem was solved in 1834 by Alexandre Joseph Hidulph Vincent. Roughly speaking, Vincent's theorem consists of using continued fractions for replacing Budan's linear transformations of the variable by Möbius transformations.

Budan's, Fourier's and Vincent theorem sank into oblivion at the end of 19th century. The last author mentioning these theorems before the second half of 20th century Joseph Alfred Serret. They were introduced again in 1976 by Collins and Akritas, for providing, in computer algebra, an efficient algorithm for real roots isolation on computers.

See also
Properties of polynomial roots
Root-finding algorithm

References

External links

Mathematical theorems
Root-finding algorithms
Real algebraic geometry